Kleť Observatory (obs. code: 046) is an astronomical observatory in the Czech Republic. It is situated in South Bohemia, south of the summit of Mount Kleť, near the town of České Budějovice.

Astronomers 

Astronomer Antonín Mrkos became director of Kleť Observatory in 1965.

Two main astronomers who currently work at Kleť Observatory are Jana Tichá and her husband Miloš Tichý.

Instruments 

The observatory has two primary telescopes:
 1.06-m KLENOT telescope (since 2002)
 0.57-m f/5.2 reflector (since 1993)

Gallery

Discoveries 

As of 2015 over a thousand asteroids were discovered at Kleť Observatory, as well as comet 196P/Tichý.

Asteroid 5583 Braunerova was discovered by A. Mrkos at Kleť Observatory in 1989.
The asteroid 7796 Járacimrman was (re)discovered at Kleť Observatory on 16 January 1996 by Zdeněk Moravec and was designated 1996 BG. It was observed until April 1996 and then in June and July 1997. It was discovered to be a lost asteroid which had previously been observed twice: at the Brera-Merate Observatory in northern Italy on 12 December 1973 and at Siding Spring Observatory (Australia), on 8 and 9 July 1990. Asteroid 4250 Perun, provisional designation "1984 UG", was discovered by Zdeňka Vávrová on 20 October 1984.

Discoveries credited to Kleť Observatory

KLENOT project

KLENOT is an initialism of KLET Observatory Near Earth and Other unusual objects observations Team and Telescope. It is limited to objects with a visual apparent magnitude of 22.0 and brighter.

List of discovered minor planets

See also 
 List of astronomical observatories

References

External links 
 

Astronomical observatories in the Czech Republic
Minor-planet discovering observatories
Český Krumlov District
1957 establishments in Czechoslovakia
20th-century architecture in the Czech Republic